Abbasabad-e Kollab (also Romanized as ‘Abbāsābād-e Kollab; also known as ‘Abbāsābād-e Golāb) is a village in Meyghan Rural District, in the Central District of Nehbandan County, South Khorasan Province, Iran. At the 2006 census, its population was 154, in 36 families.

References 

Populated places in Nehbandan County